The 1936 United States House of Representatives elections in Virginia were held on November 3, 1936 to determine who will represent the Commonwealth of Virginia in the United States House of Representatives. Virginia had nine seats in the House, apportioned according to the 1930 United States Census. Representatives are elected for two-year terms.

Overview

References

See also
 United States House elections, 1936

Virginia
1936
1936 Virginia elections